Columbia Glacier may refer to:

 Columbia Glacier (Alaska), a glacier in Alaska, USA
 Columbia Glacier (Washington), a glacier in Washington, USA
Columbia Icefield, a glacier field in the Canadian Rockies of Alberta and British Columbia, Canada